The Lanker See is a lake in the region of Holstein Switzerland in North Germany. It lies south of the town of Preetz in the district of Plön, and is crossed from south to north by the River Schwentine.

The Lanker See has wealth of small bays.
Almost the entire western area from the lakeshore to the tracks of the Preetz-Ascheberg railway line are a nature reserve.

It is divided into a large northern and a smaller southern part, that are joined by a passage a little more than 1 metre deep.
Without the islands its shore length is 17 km.
The Lanker See lies in the borough of Preetz and the municipalities of Kühren, Wahlstorf and Schellhorn.

Lakes of Schleswig-Holstein
Nature reserves in Schleswig-Holstein